The Institute of Science and Technology (IoST) is one of the five technical institutes under Tribhuvan University, Nepal's largest academic institution. With 13 central departments, 25 constituent campuses, and 103 affiliated colleges, the IoST is one of the oldest and largest technical institutes of TU. The current dean of the institute is Binil Aryal, and his office is located in Kirtipur, Kathmandu. 

The primary function of the IoST is to implement and regulate college-level academic programs on various domains of science and technology in Nepal. Through its central departments and colleges, it offers BSc, MSc, and PhD programs across a wide array of scientific disciplines. The IoST has also given high priority to collaborative exchange programs in order to make faculty, research scholars, and students more competent. The institute collaborates with different ministries, national and international organizations, and other universities to foster scientific research activity in the country. The IoST has been publishing a journal by the name of Journal of Institute of Science and Technology (JIST) since 1988.

Central departments
A total of 13 central departments come under the IoST:
 Central Department of Botany
 Central Department of Chemistry
 Central Department of Computer Science and Information Technology
 Central Department of Environmental Science
 Central Department of Biotechnology
 Central Department of Food Technology
 Central Department of Geography
 Central Department of Hydrology and Meteorology
 Central Department of Geology
 Central Department of Mathematics
 Central Department of Microbiology
 Central Department of Physics
 Central Department of Statistics

See also
The other technical institutes at TU are:
 Institute of Agriculture and Animal Science
 Institute of Engineering
 Institute of Forestry
 Institute of Medicine

References

Tribhuvan University
 Science and technology in Nepal